Live from the Have a Nice Day Tour is a live EP by American rock band Bon Jovi. It was released on February 7, 2006 only in United States through the Wal-Mart stores. It contains 6 live track recorded live during the Have a Nice Day Tour in Banknorth Garden, Boston, MA on December 10, 2005.

Track listing

Notes

These 6 tracks also appeared on the Japanese Tour Edition of the album Have a Nice Day.
Tracks 1,3,6 were used as B-sides on the single "Who Says You Can't Go Home".

Bon Jovi live albums
Live EPs
2006 EPs
2006 live albums